Shike may refer to:
Shike (novel), a 1981 novel by Robert Shea
Shike (Zen master), a Zen master rank
Retainers in early China (social group), also known as shike